Anthony Salvatore "Skip" Minisi (September 18, 1926 – May 5, 2005) was an American football halfback in the National Football League (NFL) for the New York Giants.  He was elected to the College Football Hall of Fame in 1985 based on his college career at the University of Pennsylvania and the United States Naval Academy.

After being the second pick overall in the 1948 NFL draft, Minisi played his rookie season for the New York Giants. After completing his rookie season, Minisi retired from professional football to attend the University of Pennsylvania's School of Law. He was a successful attorney for more than 40+ years with a practice in Philadelphia, Pennsylvania.

See also
 List of NCAA major college yearly punt and kickoff return leaders

External links
 

1926 births
2005 deaths
Players of American football from Newark, New Jersey
American football halfbacks
Penn Quakers football players
Navy Midshipmen football players
New York Giants players
College Football Hall of Fame inductees